Amphiglossus is a genus of skinks, lizards in the family  Scincidae.

Taxonomy
The genus Amphiglossus is usually placed in the subfamily Scincinae, which seems to be paraphyletic, however. Probably quite close to Paracontias and possibly Androngo trivittatus, it belongs to a major clade which does not seem to include the type genus Scincus. Thus, it will probably be eventually assigned to a new, yet-to-be-named subfamily.

Species
The following species are recognized as being valid. Some species which were formerly included in the genus Amphiglossus have been assigned to a more recently created genus, Madascincus , some to the genera Flexiseps and Brachyseps, and some species have been synonymized with other species in the genus Amphiglossus.
 
Amphiglossus astrolabi A.M.C. Duméril & Bibron, 1839 – diving skink
Amphiglossus reticulatus (Kaudern, 1922)

Nota bene: In the above list, a binomial authority in parentheses indicates that the species was originally described in a genus other than Amphiglossus.

References

Further reading
Duméril AMC, Bibron G (1839). Erpétologie générale ou Histoire naturelle complète des Reptiles. Tome cinquième [Volume 5]. Paris: Roret. viii + 854 pp. (Amphiglossus, new genus, pp. 606–607). (in French).

Amphiglossus
Lizard genera
Taxa named by André Marie Constant Duméril
Taxa named by Gabriel Bibron